Soro may refer to:

Places
 Soro, Denmark, a town in Denmark
 Soro (woreda), Hadiya Zone, Ethiopia
 Soro, Balasore, a town in Odisha, India
 Soro (Odisha Vidhan Sabha constituency), an assembly constituency in Balasore district, Odisha, India
 Soro, a village in Ganjuwa, Bauchi State, Nigeria

Other uses
 Soro (album), a 1987 album by Salif Keita
 Soro (fiction), a fictional extraterrestrial race in David Brin's Uplift Universe

See also
Soros (disambiguation)